{{Speciesbox
|image = Strigatella amaura (MNHN-IM-2000-30157).jpeg
|image_caption = Shell of Strigatella amaura (lectotype at MNHN, Paris)
|taxon=Strigatella amaura
|authority=(Hervier, 1897)
|synonyms_ref =
|synonyms=
 Mitra (Nebularia) amaura Hervier, 1897
 Mitra amaura Hervier, 1897
|display_parents= 3
}}Strigatella amaura'' is a species of sea snail in the miter snail family, Mitridae.

Description
The length of the shell attains 22.2 mm.

Distribution
This marine species occurs off New Caledonia and the Loyalty Islands.

References

  Hervier, J., 1898 Description d'espèces nouvelles de mollusques, provenant de l'archipel de la Nouvelle-Calédonie (suite) Journal de Conchyliologie, 45"1897" 225-248
 Fischer-Piette, E., 1950. Liste des types décrits dans le Journal de Conchyliologie et conservés dans la collection de ce journal (avec planches)(suite). Journal de Conchyliologie 90: 149-180
 Cernohorsky, W.O., 1981. Revision of J. Hervier's type-specimens of Mitracea (Mollusca, Gastropoda) from the Loyalty Islands. Bulletin du Muséum national d'Histoire naturelle 3(1): 93-1109, sér. 4° série, part. Section A

External links
 Hervier, J. (1897). Descriptions d'espèces nouvelles de l'archipel de la Nouvelle-Calédonie. Journal de Conchyliologie. 45(1): 47-69
 dosov A., Puillandre N., Herrmann M., Kantor Yu., Oliverio M., Dgebuadze P., Modica M.V. & Bouchet P. (2018). The collapse of Mitra: molecular systematics and morphology of the Mitridae (Gastropoda: Neogastropoda). Zoological Journal of the Linnean Society. 183(2): 253-337

Mitridae
Gastropods described in 1897